The French Basketball Federation (FFBB) is the governing body of basketball in France.
It was founded in 1932 (and members of the FIBA since 1933).

The Federation operates the France national teams and organises the Coupe de France (French Cup) and the amateurs national championships; for the professional championship, the Ligue Nationale de Basketball (LNB) (men) and the LFB (women) have a delegation from the FFBB. It publishes BasketBall Magazine (formerly known as Basket-Ball).

France 1st Division Men's Clubs (Pro A) 
Clubs are listed by their geographical designations on the official LNB website.

(2021–22 season)
 Boulogne-Levallois (Metropolitans 92)
 Bourg-en-Bresse (JL Bourg Basket)
 Cholet (Cholet Basket)
 Chalon-Reims (Champagne Basket)
 Dijon (JDA Dijon)
 Fos-sur-Mer (Fos Provence Basket)
 Gravelines-Dunkerque (BCM Gravelines-Dunkerque)
 Le Mans (Le Mans Sarthe Basket)
 Le Portel (ESSM Le Portel)
 Limoges (Limoges CSP)
 Lyon-Villeurbanne (ASVEL Basket)
 Monaco (AS Monaco Basket)
 Nanterre (Nanterre 92)
 Orléans (Orléans Loiret Basket)
 Paris (Paris Basketball)
 Pau-Lacq-Orthez (Élan Béarnais)
 Roanne (Chorale Roanne Basket)
 Strasbourg (Strasbourg IG)

France 1st Division Women's Clubs (LFB) 
As in the list of men's clubs above, geographic designations are those found on LFB's official site.

(2021–22 season)
 Angers (Union Féminine Angers Basket 49)
 Bourges (Tango Bourges Basket)
 Charleville-Mézières (Flammes Carolo Basket Ardennes)
 Charnay (Charnay Basket Bourgogne Sud)
 Landerneau (Landerneau Bretagne Basket)
 Landes (Basket Landes)
 Lyon (ASVEL Féminin)
 Montpellier (BLMA)
 Roche Vendée (Roche Vendée Basket Club)
 Saint-Amand (Saint-Amand Hainaut Basket)
 Tarbes (Tarbes Gespe Bigorre)
 Villeneuve-d’Ascq (ESBVA-LM)

See also
List of basketball clubs in France

External links
Official website

Basketball in France
Basketball
Basketball governing bodies in Europe
Sports organizations established in 1932